Sweeney Todd is a fictional homicidal barber.

Sweeney Todd may also refer to:
 Sweeney Todd (1928 film), 1928 British silent crime film
 Sweeney Todd: The Demon Barber of Fleet Street (1936 film), directed by George King
 Sweeney Todd: The Demon Barber of Fleet Street, Tony award-winning 1979 musical by Stephen Sondheim and Hugh Wheeler
 Sweeney Todd: The Demon Barber of Fleet Street (2007 film), Tim Burton's adaptation of the Sondheim/Wheeler musical
 The Tale of Sweeney Todd, 1997 Showtime television movie
 Sweeney Todd (ballet), ballet for orchestra by Malcolm Arnold and John Cranko
 Sweeney Todd (band), Canadian glam-rock band
 Sweeney Todd (album), the band's first album
 Sweeney Todd, rhyming slang for the Flying Squad, a division of the London Metropolitan Police, usually abbreviated as The Sweeney
 The Sweeney, British television police drama about the Flying Squad of the London Metropolitan Police